On May 14, 2022, a mass shooting occurred in Buffalo, New York, United States, at a Tops Friendly Markets supermarket in the East Side neighborhood. Ten people, all of whom were Black, were murdered and three were injured. The shooter, identified as 18-year-old Payton S. Gendron, livestreamed part of the attack on Twitch, but the livestream was shut down by the service in under two minutes. Gendron was taken into custody and charged with first-degree murder. He formally entered a plea of "not guilty" on May 19, 2022. On November 28, 2022, Gendron pleaded guilty to all state charges in the shooting, including murder, domestic terrorism, and hate crimes.

Gendron is reported to have written a manifesto, describing himself as an ethno-nationalist and a supporter of white supremacy who is motivated to commit acts of political violence. He voiced support for the far-right "Great Replacement" conspiracy theory in the context of a "white genocide". The attack has been described as an act of domestic terrorism, and it is also being investigated as a hate crime which was motivated by racism. Governor Kathy Hochul promised policy changes in the state as a result of the attack, while condemning the shooter; shortly afterwards New York banned most semi-automatic sales to people under 21 and certain types of body armor.

Shooting 
At around 2:30p.m. EDT (UTC−04:00), Gendron arrived at the Tops supermarket on Jefferson Avenue, in a predominantly Black neighborhood in Buffalo, New York. He was armed with a Bushmaster XM-15 AR-15-style rifle, modified to accept high-capacity magazines, and multiple 30-round ammunition magazines. In his car, he had a Savage Arms Axis XP hunting rifle and a Mossberg 500 shotgun. He was wearing body armor, a military helmet, and a head-mounted camera, through which he livestreamed the attack on the online service Twitch. As he approached the scene, he was recorded on his livestream saying "just got to go for it". At 2:31p.m., Buffalo police received a call reporting shots fired at the store. The first responding officers and firefighters arrived a minute later and reported bodies lying outside the building. At 2:34p.m., a dispatcher started informing responding officers of an active shooter situation at the store.

Gendron shot four people in the parking lot, killing three. He then entered the store, shooting eight more people and killing six. According to a law enforcement source, he yelled racial slurs during the incident. Many employees and customers used the store's break room to hide from the shooter and barricaded the door with a heavy desk. Other customers were hidden by employees in the milk cooler and said the shooter shot through the coolers but the milk cartons stopped the bullets. At some point, an armed security guard, former Buffalo Police Department officer Aaron Salter Jr., shot at him. Due to the shooter's body armor, Salter's bullet did not stop him. Gendron returned fire at Salter, who died at the scene. At another point, he aimed his gun at a white person behind a checkout counter but apologized and did not shoot.

By 2:36p.m., Gendron had gone to the front of the building, where patrol officers were able to talk him into dropping his gun after he reportedly aimed it at his neck. A total of sixty shots were fired during the shooting. After his arrest, he made disturbing statements regarding his motive and state of mind.

Victims 
Thirteen people—eleven of them Black and two White—were shot, ten fatally. One of them, 55-year-old Aaron Salter Jr., was a former Buffalo Police lieutenant who was working as a security guard when he confronted the shooter. In addition to Salter, the people fatally shot were Celestine Chaney, 65; Roberta A. Drury, 32; Andre Mackniel, 53; Katherine Massey, 72; Margus D. Morrison, 52; Heyward Patterson, 67; Geraldine Talley, 62; Ruth Whitfield, 86; and Pearl Young, 77.

Four victims were employees of the store including Salter, who died; the other three survived. All ten who died were Black.

Aftermath 
Dozens of residents held a vigil at the supermarket the day after the shooting. True Bethel Baptist Church held a mourning service nearby, which was attended by families of the victims and some of those who survived the attack. A moment of silence was held at game one of the 2022 National Lacrosse League playoffs eastern semifinals being held in Buffalo, between the Toronto Rock and Buffalo Bandits, and the proceeds of the 50/50 raffle were donated to the victims' families. Bandits head coach John Tavares told the media after his team's victory that the athletes played "definitely with a heavy heart" given the circumstances. A charity softball game at Sahlen Field featuring members of the Buffalo Bills held a moment of silence prior to the event and donated a portion of the proceeds to victims' families.

The Tops' closure after the shooting slowed food access in the East Side, where it was the only supermarket since it opened in 2003. Organizations inside and outside the community started programs to fill its absence, distributing and delivering food and clothing to residents. Tops is providing free shuttle service to another location and pledged to send refrigerated food trucks daily. The company later stated that it would reopen the store on July 15, with a memorial honoring the victims.

Investigation 
Erie County Sheriff John Garcia said the shooting was a "straight up racially motivated hate crime from somebody outside of our community". Stephen Belongia, the head of the local FBI office, told reporters that the agency is investigating the shooting as both a hate crime and an act of racially motivated violent extremism. Police arrested the shooter and transported him to Buffalo Police Headquarters, with police reporting him to be in custody by about 2:36p.m. The shooter's parents have cooperated with investigators and were interviewed by federal agents.

According to the Buffalo police commissioner, they uncovered information that if he escaped the supermarket, he had plans to continue his attack. The county's district attorney said he had evidence that Gendron was motivated by racial animosity. According to law enforcement sources who spoke to The Buffalo News, they were investigating Gendron's alleged contact with a number of people online, including a retired federal agent, and whether these individuals had thirty minutes of advance notice of the attack yet did not notify the authorities.

A separate investigation in connection to the shooting began on May 15, into the conduct of a 911 operator. An assistant manager at the Tops store reportedly called 911 and whispered to avoid detection by the shooter. The employee was then reportedly shouted at by the dispatcher who wondered why the woman was whispering and then allegedly hung up on the employee. The Office of the Erie County Executive announced the dispatcher was placed on administrative leave, and was fired after a disciplinary hearing.

Perpetrator 
The gunman, identified in court as Payton S. Gendron (born June 20, 2003), is a white man, 18 years old at the time of the crime. Gendron graduated from Susquehanna Valley High School, and was previously enrolled at SUNY Broome Community College in Binghamton for an engineering science program. His parents are civil engineers; he previously stated his intention to become one as well, according to his neighbors. Classmates who were interviewed by The New York Times said that he was quiet and rarely attended in-person classes, and he exhibited a range of idiosyncratic behavior, including wearing a hazmat suit to class.

The police said that Gendron had been in Buffalo in early March. They also said that he was there a day before the shooting and he had carried out reconnaissance at the Tops supermarket. According to police, he had researched previous hate-motivated attacks and shootings. According to a childhood friend, Gendron came to his house the day before the shooting and left him with five boxes of ammunition. He said that he needed space to rearrange his house and he would retrieve the ammunition later.

Investigation of previous threat 
In June 2021, Gendron had been investigated for threatening other students at his high school by the police in Broome County. A teacher had asked him about his plans after the school year, and he responded, "I want to murder and commit suicide." He was referred to a hospital for mental health evaluation and counseling but was released after being held for a day and a half.

Gendron told the police that he was joking; he would later write online about how it was a well-executed bluff. He was not charged in connection with the incident; investigators said that he had not made a specific enough threat to warrant further action. The New York State Police did not seek an order from a state court to remove guns from Gendron's possession. The mental health evaluation was not an involuntary commitment, which would have prohibited him from buying guns under federal law.

Weapons 
Gendron cleared the background check by filling in Form 4473, as is typically required under U.S. federal law. During the purchase of the Bushmaster XM-15 AR-15-style rifle used in the shooting, the seller said that Gendron passed the background check and that he did not remember Gendron. Gendron crossed state lines from his home in New York to Pennsylvania to purchase a 30-round ammunition magazine, illegal in New York state.

Before the shooting, Gendron wrote that he had purchased a rifle and illegally modified it in order to enable it to hold magazines which were capable of holding up to thirty rounds, which are illegal in New York state, where the limit is ten rounds. Gendron wrote that he selected an AR-15-style rifle for its effectiveness, and specifically selected the Bushmaster XM-15 for its notoriety. On his rifle, he had reportedly written the word nigger and referenced reparations, along with the names of white supremacist mass murderers Dylann Roof, Robert Bowers, Brenton Tarrant, and John Earnest, the acronym SYGAOWN (Stop Your Genocide Against Our White Nations), far-right slang "Buck status: broken", the year 2083, a reference to the manifesto of Anders Behring Breivik and the Archangel Michael's Cross of the fascist Romanian Iron Guard. A law enforcement source told The Daily Beast he had also written on his rifle names of one or more victims of the Waukesha Christmas parade attack. On the weapons in his car which had not been used during the shooting, he reportedly had written "White Lives Matter" and "what appears to be the name of a victim of a crime committed by a black suspect" according to CNN.

Manifesto 
Gendron is reported to have written a 180-page manifesto which he released prior to the shooting, primarily concerning the topic of mass immigration. The manifesto was originally posted on Google Docs on the evening of May 12, two days before the attack, and according to file data, it had not been modified since. Federal law enforcement sources told CNN that they were reviewing the document, as well as his 673-page online diary. The manifesto includes biographical information, including a birth date, which is identical to that of Gendron.

The author describes himself as someone who initially identified himself as being on the "authoritarian left", before he developed American neo-Nazi, antisemitic, eco-fascist, ethno-nationalist, populist, and white supremacist views. He claims to have adopted these ideological stances after he visited the discussion board /pol/ on 4chan, an imageboard, as well as the website The Daily Stormer beginning in May 2020, on which he saw "infographics, shitposts, and memes" at around the beginning of the COVID-19 pandemic in the United States. The manifesto primarily promotes the white nationalist and far-right "Great Replacement" conspiracy theory of Renaud Camus, which claims that elites are promoting immigration and decreasing white birth rates in an attempt to subject whites to a genocide. The manifesto also says that Jews and the elites are responsible for transgender inclusivity and non-white immigration, that Black people disproportionately kill white people, and that non-whites will overwhelm and wipe out the white race.

The author also expressed support for far-right mass shooters Dylann Roof, Anders Behring Breivik, and Brenton Tarrant. About 28 percent of the document is plagiarized from other sources, especially Tarrant's manifesto. As much as 57% of the text-based ideological sections were plagiarized in this manner; this was measured by excluding the sections which consisted of Internet meme images, other pictures taken from online, and logistical discussion about the equipment for the attack.

The planning for the attack commenced in January 2022, and Buffalo was targeted because it was the city with the most Black residents that was closest to the author's home. He then proceeded to select the ZIP code area within Buffalo with the highest percentage of Black residents. The manifesto includes extensive details about preparations made for the shooting, along with a plan to travel to a majority-Black neighborhood in Buffalo, after the supermarket attack, to conduct further attacks. It characterizes the attack as having been "intended to terrorize all nonwhite, non-Christian people and get them to leave the country".

Activity on chat logs 
Gendron is also reported to have had an account on the chat platform Discord, with the same username as the Twitch user who livestreamed the attack. Thousands of chat logs were retrieved from the account's postings in a private chatroom, which were written in the form of an online diary and range from November 2021 to May 13, 2022. The logs include photos of Gendron, and the author claimed to be Gendron. Police said that they believe the messages are genuine. The chat logs reference a speeding ticket that is consistent with one received by the accused. They also include to-do list items in preparation for the attack. The chat logs indicated the attack was originally planned for March 15, for the anniversary of the Christchurch mosque shootings. However, this was delayed due to the author developing a case of COVID-19. The logs contained indications from as early as November 2021 that he planned to livestream a mass shooting targeting Black people. He claimed authorship of a post on 4chan from November 9, 2021, that said, "a  will happen again soon".

The online diary also had sketches of the layout of the inside of the Tops supermarket. The diary mentions visits to the supermarket on March 8. During these visits, he notes being challenged by the security guard, calling it a close call. He also noted the numbers of Black people and white people in the supermarket during his visits. The author considered an attack in various locations, including a Walmart in Rochester, New York, before finally deciding to target the Tops supermarket in Buffalo instead. Other locations which he considered targets included churches, malls, and elementary schools with mostly Black attendees. He also considered attacking synagogues but decided against it because March 15 was not on a Saturday (the Jewish sabbath). He wrote that he used data available through Google to determine the busiest times in the supermarket.

The author of the online diary described himself as being socially isolated. He said, "I would like to say I had quite a normal childhood (<18) but that is not the case." He also said, "It's not that I actually dislike other people, it's just that they make me feel so uncomfortable I've probably spent actual years of my life just being online. And to be honest I regret it. I didn't go to friend's houses often or go to any parties or whatever. In another entry, he added: "If I could go back maybe I'd tell myself to get the fuck off 4chan... and get an actual life." At one point in the chat logs, the author describes killing and mutilating a cat. The chat logs include occasional suicidal ideation and self-doubt from the author.

In a post dated December 9, 2021, he described staying in the emergency room of a hospital for 20 hours on May 28, 2021, as a result of stating his intention to commit murder–suicide in an online assignment for his economics class. He described the hospital stay as a very negative experience that encouraged him to take action. In other entries, he posted photos of modifications he made to his rifle so that it could be equipped with 30-round magazines, while acknowledging that this was illegal in New York. He also posted details about obtaining other equipment for a planned attack, such as body armor and a helmet.

About 30 minutes before the shooting began, invitations to the chatroom that hosted the online diary logs were sent to a small group of other Discord users. At least fifteen other users joined the chatroom after that point, who would have been able to view the chat logs. According to a Discord spokesperson, they found no indication that any other users were aware of the diary before that time. He also sent links to the Twitch livestream that would show the attack. According to the message attached to the invite, Discord users could also view a livestream through the Discord chatroom, as opposed to the Twitch livestream. The chatroom was disabled when Discord learned about its alleged relationship to the shooting.

Other than the online diary, chat logs were also retrieved from a second chatroom on Discord, which was dedicated to discussing weapons. There, the user reported to have been Gendron sought advice regarding equipment such as body armor. Prior to the shooting, the livestream footage quickly leaked to multiple forms of social media, including Facebook, Twitter, Instagram, and Reddit.

Legal proceedings 
Gendron was arraigned in the Buffalo City Court, which is a New York State Court. Represented by a public defender, he entered a not guilty plea to multiple charges of first-degree murder. A felony hearing was scheduled to begin on May 19 in front of a grand jury. He was held without bail under suicide watch. On the same day, the Attorney General of the United States Merrick Garland confirmed that the United States Department of Justice was investigating the shooting as a hate crime and an act of racially-motivated violent extremism.

On May 19, it was announced that he was indicted on the charge of first-degree murder by a grand jury, in a decision that had been handed up the day prior. Gendron briefly appeared in court on May 19. On June 1, a grand jury issued a 25-count indictment against Gendron. The jury charged him with "one count of domestic terrorism motivated by hate", as well as "10 counts of first-degree murder as a hate crime, 10 counts of second-degree murder as a hate crime, three counts of attempted second-degree murder as a hate crime and one count of second-degree criminal possession of a weapon", according to The Washington Post. Gendron was arraigned in Erie County Court on June 2, 2022, and pled not guilty to all 25 charges.

On June 3, 2022, a filing made on behalf of one of the survivors from the attack sought a court order for the preservation of a number of items in the possession of Gendron's parents. The filing sought to preserve, among other things, any of his available cellphones, computers (and web browsing history), travel and school records, video game consoles, and receipts for firearms and ammunition. Additionally, the filing requested that his parents be made to provide pretrial depositions in court by July 29.

On June 15, Gendron was charged with 26 counts of federal hate crimes and also additional gun charges. Should he be convicted of any of the more serious federal hate crimes, he faces the possibility of the death penalty. If the death penalty is applied, it would only be carried out by the federal government. On November 17, Gendron agreed to plead guilty to all state charges. On November 28, he pled guilty to fifteen state-level counts: ten counts of first-degree murder, three counts of attempted murder motivated by hate, criminal weapons possession, and domestic terrorism motivated by hate. On February 15, 2023, Gendron was denied youthful offender status and received 10 concurrent life sentences, without the possibility of parole.

, federal charges are still ongoing. In December 2022, Gendron's lawyer indicated that he would be willing to plead guilty in order to avoid receiving the death penalty, which does not exist under New York state law.

Reactions

National 
President Joe Biden offered his prayers for the victims and their families; he called the shooting a racially motivated hate crime, an act of domestic terrorism, and went on to call white supremacy a "poison... running through our body politic". The Erie County Sheriff's Office tweeted their condolences to all of the victims and their families and offered resources and personnel to assist the officers.

Twitch confirmed that its service was used to broadcast the shooting. It said that the account that posted the livestream had been indefinitely suspended and that any attempts to re-stream the footage would be monitored and prohibited. The shooter's livestream was removed less than two minutes after the violence started according to a spokesperson; it was unclear if he was still actively firing at the time. The livestream was recorded by at least one individual and posted to the site Streamable, where it had acquired more than 3 million views by May 15. The spread of the video on other sites has led to discussions about social media sites' liability, responses to similar content, and free speech on the sites.

American publications widely condemned the conspiracy theories—including the notion of a "white genocide" supposedly occurring in the U.S.—advocated by the assailant. The Daily Beast journalist Andy Craig has argued that beliefs "centered around the claim that there is a deliberate plot to commit to genocide against white Americans—using non-white immigration as its supposed primary means" created a "noxious brew of ideas" that animated the killer, recommending that all supporters of freedom of speech as an ideal condemn such extremist thinking. The shooter's claim of a "Great Replacement" has drawn increased scrutiny of Republican political and media figures who have made statements embracing or echoing the conspiracy, most prominently Fox News commentator Tucker Carlson. National Review, a conservative news magazine, criticized this scrutiny of Carlson, with columnist Dan McLaughlin saying: "He never mentioned Tucker Carlson, and [he] expressed his hatred for Fox News [in the manifesto]." In response, Carlson said that the suspect's manifesto was "not recognizably left-wing or right-wing; it's not really political at all. The document is crazy." House Republican Conference chair Elise Stefanik, the third highest-ranking Republican in the U.S. House, also had attention drawn to her hardline views in the conspiracy theory that the Democratic Party is trying to replace or overwhelm Republican voters with immigrants, using an open-door immigration policy in order to win elections.

Footage from the Buffalo shooting was reportedly included on a violence-glorifying website created by the 2022 Colorado Springs shooting’s suspect.

Legislative 

The proposed Domestic Terrorism Prevention Act, which would have established domestic terrorism offices in the DOJ and FBI focused on neo-Nazis and white supremacy, passed the House on May 18 but failed in the Senate on May 26. Republicans argued that the measure duplicated already existing efforts by American law enforcement while also risking targeting individuals unfairly as political extremists. Democrats noted the tough polarization in Congress while arguing that the Republicans failed to compromise on pragmatic changes to fight gun deaths.

On June 7, 2022, the United States Senate Committee on the Judiciary held hearings to examine "the 'Metastasizing' Domestic Terrorism Threat After the Buffalo Attack." The Committee heard testimony from the son of rampage victim Ruth Whitfield, former commissioner of the Buffalo Fire Department Garnell Whitfield, Jr., who asked the committee, "to imagine the faces of your mothers as you look at the face of my mother, Mrs. Ruth Whitfield… and ask yourself… is there nothing we can do? Is there nothing that you personally are willing to do to stop the cancer of white supremacy and the domestic terrorism it inspires?".

In response to this attack, as well as the Robb Elementary School shooting in Uvalde, Texas that occurred 10 days afterwards, the New York State Legislature passed laws banning semi-automatic sales to most people under 21 as well as certain types of body armor.

Local 

New York Governor Kathy Hochul traveled to Buffalo to assist with the response. Governor Hochul said "we'll be aggressive in our pursuit of anyone who subscribes to the ideals professed by other white supremacists and how there's a feeding frenzy on social media platforms where hate festers more hate." Hochul called for stronger federal gun violence prevention legislation, saying "What has made this so lethal, and so devastating for this community, was the high-capacity magazine that would have had to have been purchased elsewhere, that’s not legal in the state of New York."

The attorney for one of the victims' families, Benjamin Crump, has argued that public policy changes need to take place to fight political extremist activism as a result of the shooting. He remarked, "We have to direct our attention to these internet sites that inspire these young people that are radicalizing them to be hate-mongers, to be people who hate people because the color of their skin."

The New York State Education Department announced that it was cancelling the U.S. Government and History Regents Exam because it contained a question that the department determined might be upsetting to students in the aftermath of the shooting. The state did not specify what the question said or why it may have been objectionable. Canisius College, a local university that Aaron Salter Jr. had previously attended, posthumously awarded him a bachelor's degree during their 2022 graduation ceremony.

International 
Canadian Prime Minister Justin Trudeau condemned the attack. Buffalo is on the Canadian border and is adjacent to Fort Erie, Ontario. Jim Diodati, the mayor of Niagara Falls, Ontario, called Buffalo mayor Byron Brown to express his solidarity with Buffalo. Flags in Niagara Falls were lowered at half-mast in honor of the victims.

See also 

 Christchurch mosque shootings, a similar attack which targeted Muslims
 2019 El Paso shooting, a similar attack which targeted Hispanics
 2020–2022 United States racial unrest
 2021 Boulder shooting, a similar attack which targeted a grocery store
 Racism against African Americans
 Timeline of terrorist attacks in the United States

References

2022 active shooter incidents in the United States
2022 in New York (state)
2022 mass shootings in the United States
2022 murders in the United States
2020s crimes in New York (state)
21st century in Buffalo, New York
21st-century mass murder in the United States
African-American history in Buffalo, New York
Attacks on buildings and structures in 2022
Attacks on buildings and structures in New York (state)
Attacks on shops in North America
Attacks on supermarkets
Filmed killings
Hate crimes
Livestreamed crimes
Mass murder in 2022
Mass murder in New York (state)
Mass murder in the United States
Mass shootings in New York (state)
Mass shootings in the United States
May 2022 crimes in the United States
Neo-fascist terrorist incidents in the United States
Racially motivated violence against African Americans
Terrorist incidents in New York (state)
Terrorist incidents in the United States in 2022
White genocide conspiracy theory
White nationalist terrorism